José Barreto may refer to:

 José Barreto (Brazilian footballer) (born 1976), Brazilian football striker
 José Barreto (Argentine footballer) (born 2000), Argentine football forward